Mohammad Jasmir Ansari is an Indian politician and a member of the Uttar Pradesh Legislative Assembly in India. He represented the Laharpur constituency of Uttar Pradesh and is a member of the Bahujan Samaj Party.

Early life and education
Mohammad Jasmir Ansari was born in Laharpur and he fully struggled in life when he came in politics, then Mohammad Salim Ansari (Sabhasad) helped him in beginning of his career. Salim Ansari was also famous in his time period as he won Sabhasad election 3 times.

Political career
Mohammad Jasmir Ansari has been a MLA for two terms. He represented the Laharpur constituency and is a member of the Bahujan Samaj Party political party. 

Jasmir Ansari has been nominated as a Member of the Uttar Pradesh Legislative Council representing the Samajwadi Party in 2022.

Posts held

See also
 Laharpur (Assembly constituency)
 Sixteenth Legislative Assembly of Uttar Pradesh
 Uttar Pradesh Legislative Assembly

References 

1968 births
Bahujan Samaj Party politicians from Uttar Pradesh
Living people
People from Sitapur district
Uttar Pradesh MLAs 2007–2012
Uttar Pradesh MLAs 2012–2017
Uttar Pradesh politicians